ADK Moderne Kaedi is a Mauritanean football club based in Kaédi the capital of the Gorgol Region. 
The club plays in the Mauritanean Premier League.

Stadium
Currently, the team plays at the 5,000 capacity Stade de Kaédi.

References

External links
Soccerway

Football clubs in Mauritania